Eduardo Solaeche (born 22 November 1993) is a Spanish swimmer. He competed in the men's 200 metre individual medley event at the 2016 Summer Olympics.

References

External links
 

1993 births
Living people
Spanish male medley swimmers
Olympic swimmers of Spain
Swimmers at the 2016 Summer Olympics
Place of birth missing (living people)
Swimmers at the 2010 Summer Youth Olympics